Mountains of Pomeroy are a mountain range that runs west of the town of Pomeroy in County Tyrone, Northern Ireland. The area around the mountain range is scenic, with a variety of moorland, forestry and rural farming. The mountain range is recalled in the ballad The Mountains of Pomeroy by Dr. George Sigerson, the Anthem of Tyrone GAA.

References

Mountains and hills of County Tyrone